Dhruv Maisuria (born 6 August 1998) is a Botswana cricketer. He was named in Botswana's squad for the 2015 ICC World Cricket League Division Six tournament in England, playing in one match.

In May 2019, he was named in Botswana's squad for the Regional Finals of the 2018–19 ICC T20 World Cup Africa Qualifier tournament in Uganda. He made his Twenty20 International (T20I) debut for Botswana against Nigeria on 21 May 2019. In October 2021, he was named in Botswana's squad for their matches in Group B of the 2021 ICC Men's T20 World Cup Africa Qualifier tournament in Rwanda.

References

External links
 

1998 births
Living people
Botswana cricketers
Botswana Twenty20 International cricketers
Indian emigrants to Botswana
Place of birth missing (living people)